"A Little Respect" is a song written and recorded by the English synth-pop duo Erasure, released in September 1988. It was written by Vince Clarke and Andy Bell. The lyrics are a plea to a lover to show compassion and respect. The heavily synthesized instrumentation is accentuated by acoustic guitar and Bell's vocal falsetto in the chorus. It was their tenth single and was taken from their third studio album, The Innocents (1988). Known as one of their signature songs, the single reached number four on the UK Singles Chart and was Erasure's second consecutive top-20 hit on the US Billboard Hot 100, where it made number 14, and reached number two on the US Hot Dance Club Songs chart.

There are several remixes of the song. It was originally mixed by Mark Saunders and Phil Legg on the 1988 UK singles, and Justin Strauss for the original US release. In 2006 was remixed by Jadded Alliance for the Future Retro remix compilation sampling some elements of the Justin Strauss' remixes from 1988. In 2009 new remixes appeared: One in the Pop! Remixed UK EP, and one more in the Phantom Bride EP celebrating the 25th anniversary of The Innocents by Wayne G and Alan Allder, the same year, on Erasure's official web site two more mixes appeared for download: one by Glenn Nichols and a dub mix of the Wayne G and Alan Allder mix.

An acoustic version of appears on the Moon & the Sky Plus EP in the UK. And another country acoustic version on the live album On the Road to Nashville.

Critical reception
Darren Lee from The Quietus described it as "a song so giddily exuberant that even the tawdry spectre of Wheatus can't quite tarnish its lustre."

Impact and legacy
Metro Weekly placed "A Little Respect" at number-one in their ranking of Erasure's 40 Greatest Tracks in 2014. Chris Gerard wrote,

"Opening with that distinct, stately keyboard riff before an acoustic guitar comes in and adds to the rhythm, "A Little Respect" is Erasure at their apex. Very few pop songs can be considered perfect, and this is one of them. It is guaranteed even to this day to get a room full of people singing at the top of their lungs. It just feels good. The heavily rhythmic background, the positive and self-affirming lyrics, Andy Bell's note-perfect vocal delivery… it's a combination that came together to form a song for the ages. It reached #14 in the US and #4 in the UK, but it's had the lasting impact of a #1 hit."

Treblezine included the song in their A History of Synth-Pop in 50 Essential Tracks. They wrote,

"If there's a synth-pop Mount Rushmore, surely Vince Clarke is one of the figures carved on its rockface. He appears here twice, as does a former band, and there are a handful of other short-lived projects we left out. But Clarke's most enduring project is also his most purely pop, with the chart performance to prove it. Erasure had 13 top-10 singles in the UK since 1986, plus three US top-40 singles, including this standout opener of 1988's The Innocents. At a lean 3:33, Clarke and Andy Bell compress synth-pop innovation and disco-pop immediacy into a perfect moment of transcendent pop glory."

Time Out ranked "A Little Respect" number 10 in their The 50 Best Gay Songs to Celebrate Pride All Year Long in 2022.

English Rugby league club Hull Kingston Rovers adopted "A Little Respect" as the club's official song for the 2015 Challenge Cup Final, their first appearance in a Challenge Cup final match for over 30 years. Initially proving popular among fans, social media videos of Hull Kingston Rovers supporters singing the song following their semi-final victory against Warrington Wolves went viral, resulting in Andy Bell granting the club's players and staff permission to record a charity single in aid of two local children's charities and the Terrence Higgins Trust. Hull Kingston Rovers would go on to lose 50-0 to Leeds Rhinos in the final held at Wembley Stadium. Andy Bell would later perform the song before a match at the club's Craven Park stadium in 2016 and partnered again with the club and the Terrence Higgins Trust to release a charity kit featuring the song's lyrics.

Track listings

7-inch and cassette single
 "A Little Respect"
 "Like Zsa Zsa Zsa Gabor"
 In the UK, another 7-inch single containing multiple postcards was also issued.

12-inch single
A1. "A Little Respect" (extended version)
B1. "Like Zsa Zsa Zsa Gabor" (Mark Freegard remix)
B2. "Love Is Colder Than Death"

12-inch remix single
A1. "A Little Respect" (Big Train mix)
B1. "Like Zsa Zsa Zsa Gabor" (Rico Conning remix)
B2. "Love Is Colder Than Death"

CD single
 "A Little Respect" (7-inch version) – 3:31
 "A Little Respect" (Mark Saunders remix) – 6:35
 "Like Zsa Zsa Gabor" (Rico Conning remix) – 6:05
 "Love Is Colder Than Death" – 2:10

US and Canadian 12-inch single
A1. "A Little Respect" (12-inch vocal) – 6:27
A2. "A Little Respect" (12-inch house mix) – 6:42
B1. "A Little Respect" (12-inch remix) – 6:35
B2. "A Little Respect" (Big Train mix) – 6:07
B3. "Like Zsa Zsa Gabor" (Rico Conning remix) – 6:05

Japanese mini-CD single
 "A Little Respect"
 "A Little Respect" (extended version)

Charts

Weekly charts

Year-end charts

Certifications

Björn Again version

In June 1992, Erasure released their Abba-esque extended play (EP), which contains cover versions of four ABBA songs. In response, an Australian ABBA parody group called Björn Again covered two Erasure songs—"A Little Respect" and "Stop!"—and included them on their Erasure-ish EP, which was issued as their debut single on 12 October 1992. The two-song EP peaked at number 18 in Ireland, number 25 on the UK Singles Chart and number 67 on the German Singles Chart.

Track listings
7-inch and cassette single
 "A Little Respect"
 "Stop!"

12-inch picture disc
A. "A Little Respect" (more)
AA. "Stop!" (more)

CD single
 "A Little Respect"
 "Stop!"
 "A Little Respect" (more)
 "Stop!" (more)

Charts

Wheatus version

American rock band Wheatus covered "A Little Respect" for their self-titled debut album. Released on 2 July 2001, it peaked at number three in the United Kingdom (besting the peak of Erasure's original) while reaching number five in Ireland and number 19 in Austria.

Critical reception
Ayhan Sahin of Billboard magazine reviewed the song favorably, saying that the version is "surprisingly polished, paying serious homage to Brit synth popsters Andy Bell and Vince Clark." He goes on to say that the structure of the song stays "intact, as does that super-sticky chorus, with acoustic and electric guitars playing back and forth in place of the '80s electronic beats."

Music video
The music video was directed by the Malloys and was released in July 2001. It features Shawn Hatosy and Brittany Murphy.

Track listings
UK CD single
 "A Little Respect" – 3:27
 "Sunshine" (X-ecutioners mix) – 2:52
 "Teenage Dirtbag" (live at The Chapel) – 4:44

UK cassette single
 "A Little Respect" (David Thorner Mix 1) – 3:24
 "Sunshine" (X-ecutioners mix) – 2:52

European CD single
 "A Little Respect" (David Thorner Mix 1) – 3:25
 "Teenage Dirtbag" (live at The Chapel) – 4:43

Australian CD single
 "A Little Respect" (David Thorner Mix 1) – 3:26
 "Leroy" (live at The Chapel) – 3:40
 "Wannabe Gangstar" (live at The Chapel) – 4:02
 "Truffles" (live at The Chapel) – 3:51

Charts

Weekly charts

Year-end charts

Certifications

Release history

Other cover versions
 In 1998, Portuguese Band Silence 4 covered the song with great success on their debut album Silence Becomes It 
 In 2009, British singer-songwriter Kate Walsh released a cover version of the song on her album Peppermint Radio.
 In 2009 Jody Watley covered the song for her mixed covers/original album 'The Makeover', included only on the international release.
 In 2011, CoLD SToRAGE recorded a chiptune cover of the track.
 In 2013, Anna Meredith released a cover of the track on her second EP for Moshi Moshi, Jet Black Raider, under the title "ALR".
 In 2014, Juice Vocal Ensemble included an arrangement of the track on their second album, Laid Bare: Love Songs.
 In 2017, JD McPherson covered the track.
 In 2021, Agoney recorded a version of the song for the Spanish film El Cover.
 In 2022, Kevin Johansen recorded another version of the song for his album "Tú ve".

References

1988 singles
1988 songs
1992 singles
2001 singles
2009 singles
Columbia Records singles
Erasure songs
LGBT-related songs
Music videos directed by The Malloys
Mute Records singles
Number-one singles in Scotland
Polydor Records singles
Reprise Records singles
Sire Records singles
Song recordings produced by Stephen Hague
Songs written by Andy Bell (singer)
Songs written by Vince Clarke
UK Independent Singles Chart number-one singles